Clementina (minor planet designation: 252 Clementina) is a large main belt asteroid that was discovered by French astronomer Henri Joseph Anastase Perrotin on 11 October 1885 in Nice, France. The origin of the name is not known.

Photometric observations of this asteroid at the Organ Mesa Observatory in Las Cruces, New Mexico, during 2012 gave a light curve with a period of 10.864 ± 0.001 hours and a brightness variation of 0.37 ± 0.02 in magnitude. This result is in agreement with previous studies.

References

External links 
 Lightcurve plot of 252 Clementina, Palmer Divide Observatory, B. D. Warner (2007)
 Asteroid Lightcurve Database (LCDB), query form (info )
 Dictionary of Minor Planet Names, Google books
 Asteroids and comets rotation curves, CdR – Observatoire de Genève, Raoul Behrend
 Discovery Circumstances: Numbered Minor Planets (1)-(5000) – Minor Planet Center
 
 

Background asteroids
Clementina
Clementina
18851011